Ali Akbar Parvaresh (‎; 1942 – 27 December 2013) was an Iranian politician. He was Minister of Education from 1981 to 1985 and also a parliament member for three terms, first elected in 1980 and served again from 1988 to 1996. He was a presidential candidate twice, the first time in July 1981 election which he received 401,035 (2.8% of votes) and the second time in October 1981 election gained 341,841 (2.1%) and ranked second after Ali Khamenei. He was deputy to Secretary-General of Islamic Coalition Party until 2001.

References

1942 births
2013 deaths
Government ministers of Iran
Islamic Coalition Party politicians
Members of the 1st Islamic Consultative Assembly
Members of the 3rd Islamic Consultative Assembly
Members of the 4th Islamic Consultative Assembly
First Deputies of Islamic Consultative Assembly
Candidates in the July 1981 Iranian presidential election
Central Council of the Islamic Republican Party members
Politicians from Isfahan
Members of the Assembly of Experts for Constitution